Uvanilla unguis is a species of sea snail, a marine gastropod mollusk in the family Turbinidae, the turban snails.

Description
The size of the shell varies between 20 mm and 40 mm. The solid, imperforate shell has a conic shape. Its color pattern is brown or gray. The conic spire is acute. The spire contains six whorls. Those above are very obliquely striate and flattened, longitudinally inegularly plicate, sharply carinated at the periphery and produced into radiating compressed truncated digitations. The base of the shell is flat or concave, concentrically regularly and finely lirate, lirae number about seven, radiately densely, finely lamellose-striate. The aperture is very oblique, and angular at periphery, its lower margin nearly straight. It is silvery within. The oblique columella is slightly concave, excavated at the position of the umbilicus, with a spiral white rib. The parietal callus covers over half the base of the shell.

The operculum is white outside, excavated on each side of a strong granulose curved central rib, the terminations connected by a shorter ridge curved in the opposite direction.

Distribution
This species occurs from the Gulf of California, Western Mexico to Panama

References

External links
 To World Register of Marine Species
 

unguis
Gastropods described in 1828
Taxa named by William Wood (zoologist)